Clinus heterodon, the westcoast klipfish, is a species of clinid that occurs in subtropical waters of the Atlantic Ocean from Namibia to South Africa where it is a denizen of tide pools.  This species can reach a maximum length of  TL. This species feeds on marine invertebrates.

References

heterodon
Fish described in 1836